Pholo is an unclassified Loloish language of Yunnan, China. Although culturally associated with the Phula languages,  does not consider it to be linguistically related to the Phula languages.

Pholo speakers are also referred to as Black Phula and Flowery Phula.

Classification
 specifically excludes Pholo, noting that it does not share the defining features of Southeastern Loloish. However,  classifies Pholo as a Southeastern Loloish language, and considers it to be most closely related to Zokhuo

Distribution
Pholo speakers are most densely concentrated in:
Aji Township, Yanshan County
eastern Tianxing Township, Qiubei County

Other Pholo speakers are found in:
eastern Yanshan County
Pingzhai Township, Qiubei County
western Guangnan County
Xinzhai Township, Malipo County

Vocabulary

Most, but not all, of the Pholo words above do not share the following innovations that define Southeastern Ngwi.
 Proto-Ngwi * and * > Proto-Southeastern Ngwi * (modern reflexes: tɬ, kɬ, k, t, ɬ, etc.)
 Proto-Ngwi * and * > Proto-Southeastern Ngwi * (modern reflexes: tɬʰ, kɬʰ, kʰ, tʰ, ɬ, etc.)
 Proto-Ngwi * and * > Proto-Southeastern Ngwi * (modern reflexes: dɮ, ɡɮ, ɡ, d, etc.)
 Proto-Ngwi * and * > Proto-Southeastern Ngwi * (modern reflexes: ndɮ, ŋɡɮ, nd, etc.)

Other Pholo words from :
 (neck)
 (pus)
 (full)
 (long)
 (name)
 (cooked)

Notes

References

 
 
  (Handwritten Mimeograph).

Loloish languages